Spey casting is a casting technique used in fly fishing. Spey casting can be accomplished with either a normal length fly rod, or a rod referred to as a double-handed fly rod, often called a Spey rod. Spey rods can also be used for standard overhead casting.

Spey casting is used for fishing large rivers for salmon and large trout such as steelhead and sea trout. Spey technique is also used in saltwater surf casting. All of these situations require the angler to cast larger flies long distances. The two-handed Spey technique allows more powerful casts and avoids obstacles on the shore by keeping most of the line in front of the angler.

History 
Spey casting originated in both Wales and Scotland in the mid-1800s. Before the name Spey cast was popularised in the late 1800s, named after river Spey in Scotland. This style of casting originally went by the name of the Welsh throw. and the Under-handed cast. Therefore, the Spey cast was developed so one successfully cast on a large river such as the Spey and the Wye. When Spey casting was introduced,  rods were used. These rods were made of greenheart, a heavy wood imported from British Guyana.

There are two groups of Spey casts, the "splash and go" and the "waterborne anchor". Splash and go casts contain a backstroke that is in the air. The line then falls to the water, and the forward cast starts as soon as the tip of the line touches the water. The waterborne anchor casts are different, as they contain a backcast that stays on the water. In these types of casts, there is no requirement to achieve perfect timing in order to forward cast after.

While there are many variations of the Spey cast, the basic technique is broken down into a few simple actions. With the fly line floating directly downstream, the angler first lifts the line off the water with the tip of the rod. The angler then sweeps the line backwards just above the water, and allows just the fly and leader to "anchor" the cast by touching the water one to two rod lengths away. This back-cast is often referred to as the "D-loop", from the curving shape of the line between the anchor and the tip of the rod. While swinging the "D-loop", it is important to make one continuous, deliberate motion with the rod tip climbing at a 45-degree angle off the water. As the D-loop comes around, the cast is completed by firing the line forward with a sharp two-handed "push-pull" motion on the handle of the rod while making an abrupt stop with the rod tip at the end of the cast. The cast is most easily compared to a roll cast in one-handed fly fishing, although by using the fly as an anchor, a Spey cast allows a greater loading of the rod and thus achieves greater distance than a one-handed cast.

Styles of Spey casting 
The two most commonly used styles of Spey casting are the "Single Spey" and the "Double Spey". Mastering both the Single Spey cast and the Double Spey cast will be essential if the fly caster is to be able to cast from either bank of the river in whatever type of wind that may be present.

Single Spey casting

The Single Spey cast may be considered better by some, as it cast the line further, and it can be used with winds blowing upstream. This Single Spey cast is part of the "Splash and Go" (or touch & Go/Kiss & Go) group of casts.

Double Spey casting

The Double Spey cast may be considered easier to perform than the Single Spey, but only because this cast can be performed more slowly and deliberately, and corrections more easily made during elements of the cast. It is a sustained anchor cast in that some of the fly line stays in contact with the water at all times until the final forward casting stroke is made. This Double Spey cast is useful in downstream winds.

World records 

The world's longest  single spey cast was made by Geir Hansen from Norway. The cast measured , and was made during the Hemsedal Spey Competition in 2021. Hansen also set the world record for the 18ft class, with a  cast, at the same event.

See also
Reach cast
Surf fishing

References

Further reading

Fly fishing